Cyril Bardsley (1931–2020) was an English male track cyclist.

Cycling career
Bardsley was a British track champion, winning the British National Individual Sprint Championships in 1951.

He raced for the Manchester Clarion club and after retiring from cycling ran a bicycle shop in Stockport.

References

1931 births
2020 deaths
British male cyclists
British track cyclists
Sportspeople from Manchester